Gayathri Suresh is an Indian actress.

Filmography 
 All films are in Malayalam,  unless otherwise noted.

Television

Short films

Honors
She won the Femina Miss Kerala beauty pageant in 2014.

References

External links
 
 

Living people
21st-century Indian actresses
Actresses in Malayalam cinema
Indian beauty pageant winners
Indian film actresses
Actresses in Telugu cinema
1992 births